81-760/761 (Oka) is a model of subway car used on the Moscow Metro and the Baku Metro. It was designed by Metrowagonmash and is manufactured by Metrovagonmash and Tver Carriage Works.

External links 

 Official page of 81-760/761 "Oka", Transmashholding (english version)
 Official page of Metrowagonmash (english version)

Electric multiple units of Russia
Moscow Metro